Lacelle is an unincorporated community in Knox Township, Clarke County, Iowa, United States.

History
Lacelle's population was 25 in 1902, and 33 in 1925.

References

Unincorporated communities in Clarke County, Iowa
Unincorporated communities in Iowa